Bondy is a commune in the northeastern suburbs of Paris, France. In 2019, it had a population of 54,587.

Name
The name Bondy was recorded for the first time around AD 600 as Bonitiacum, meaning "estate of Bonitius", a Gallo-Roman landowner.

History

During the Middle Ages, Bondy was mostly forest, and the forest of Bondy was a well-known haunt of bandits and robbers and was considered extremely dangerous.

On 3 January 1905, a third of the territory of Bondy was detached and became the commune of Les Pavillons-sous-Bois.

On 30 October 2007, a gas explosion killed one person and injured 47 people.

Bondy and its integration into Paris is the subject of part of the second-last chapter of Graham Robb's book Parisians.

Administration
Bondy is part of the canton of Bondy, created in 2015.

Transport
Bondy is served by Bondy station on Paris RER line E and the Line 4 (T4) of the Tramways in Île-de-France.

Education
 the commune had 27 state-funded primary schools, with 6,900 students. There were also three publicly funded lycées, or senior high schools, and five junior high schools.
 There are 13 écoles maternelles, or preschools, and 14 publicly funded elementary schools
 The junior high schools are named after: Pierre Brossolette, Henri Sellier, Jean Zay, Jean Renoir, and Pierre Curie
 There are three state-funded high schools: Lycée Léo-Lagrange, Lycée Marcel-Pagnol, and Lycée Jean-Renoir. 

Bondy also has a private Roman Catholic high school, Institut privé de l'Assomption, which has its own elementary school.

Population growth
The population data in the table and graph below refer to the commune of Bondy proper, in its geography at the given years. The commune of Bondy ceded the commune of Les Pavillons-sous-Bois in 1905.

Immigration

Notable people
 Sylvie Bouchet Bellecourt, politician
 Élodie Fontan, actress
 Serge Gakpe, footballer
 Max Hilaire, footballer
 Muriel Hurtis, track and field, athlete
 Jonathan Ikone, footballer
 Steeven Joseph-Monrose, footballer
 Kevin Lafrance, footballer
 David Larose, judoka
 Lartiste, singer
 André Malraux, novelist, art theorist and minister of cultural affiars
 Kylian Mbappé, footballer
 Sylvain Meslien, footballer
 Randal Kolo Muani, footballer
 Guy Moussi, footballer
 Michael Nicoise, footballer
 Maureen Nisima, fencer
 Claude-Carloman de Rulhière, poet and historian.
 William Saliba, footballer
 Lalya Sidibe, basketball player
 Alpha Sissoko, footballer
 Doriane Tahane, basketball player
 Audrey Tcheumeo, judoka
 Teddy Tinmar, athlete
 Karidja Touré, actress
 Bakaye Traoré, footballer
 Fodie Traore, footballer
 Jimmy Vicaut, athlete
 Thierry Zig, basketball player

See also
Communes of the Seine-Saint-Denis department

References

External links

 Town council website 

Communes of Seine-Saint-Denis